Hany Soh Hui Bin (born 1987) is a Singaporean politician and lawyer. A member of the governing People's Action Party (PAP), she has been the Member of Parliament (MP) representing the Woodgrove division of Marsiling–Yew Tee GRC since 2020.

Education
Soh attended Bendemeer Secondary School under the Normal (Academic) stream before graduating from Temasek Polytechnic after her O Level with a diploma in law and management. 

She subsequently went on to complete a Bachelor of Laws degree at the University of Liverpool in 2011.

Career

Legal career
Soh joined MSC Law Corporation in 2016 and became its director in 2017.

Political career
Following her graduation in 2011, Soh had been a volunteer, along with other grassroots members of Bukit Panjang with the support of Teo Ho Pin, Mayor of North West District. 

In 2013, she was called to the Singapore Bar as an Advocate and Solicitor of the Supreme Court. In 2014, she established the first Community Legal Clinic in a Residents' Committee centre. 

Soh joined the governing People's Action Party (PAP) and served as a member of the PAP HQ Executive Committee between 2017 and 2018.

During the 2020 general election, Soh was fielded as part of a four-member PAP team contesting in Marsiling–Yew Tee GRC. On 5 July, during her election campaign, she fell and fractured her foot. She and the PAP team in Marsiling–Yew Tee GRC were eventually elected into Parliament after defeating the opposition Singapore Democratic Party with 63.18% of the vote.

References

External links 
 Hany Soh on Parliament of Singapore
 Hany Soh on Facebook

1987 births
Living people
Singaporean women lawyers
21st-century Singaporean lawyers
Singaporean women in politics
People's Action Party politicians
Temasek Polytechnic alumni
Alumni of the University of Liverpool
Members of the Parliament of Singapore